Bentonian may refer to:

 Hard money (policy) regarding the use of Bentonian currency, named after US Senator Thomas Hart Benton
 The Bentonia School, a style of guitar playing